Brittany Leanna Robertson (born April 18, 1990) is an American actress. She is known for her lead role in The First Time (2012), and has appeared in the films Tomorrowland (2015), The Space Between Us (2017), A Dog's Purpose (2017), and I Still Believe (2020).

She appeared as Marnie Cooper in the opening scene of Wes Craven's Scream 4 (2011). Robertson is also known for her starring roles in television series such as Life Unexpected (2010–2011), The Secret Circle (2011–2012), Under the Dome (2013–2014), Girlboss (2017), For the People (2018–2019), and The Rookie: Feds (2022).

At the start of her career, she was mostly credited as Brittany Robertson, with Britt Robertson used exclusively from late 2011 onward.

Early life
Robertson was born in Charlotte, North Carolina, to Beverly (née Hayes) and Ryan Robertson, a restaurant owner. Robertson grew up in Greenville, South Carolina. She is the oldest of seven children; her mother and stepfather have three children (two girls, one boy), and her father and stepmother also have three children (one girl, two boys).

When she was 14 years old, Robertson moved from North Carolina to Los Angeles to audition for TV pilots. Her grandmother Shuler Robertson came with her. Robertson said that they would knit together during down-time on set. She has been living on her own since her grandmother returned to North Carolina when Robertson was sixteen. They remain close.

Career
Robertson first appeared before an audience when performing various roles on stage at the Greenville Little Theater in her hometown. At age 12, she began making extended trips to Los Angeles to audition for roles in television series' and landed a role in a television pilot for a series which was never picked up by a network. She made her screen debut as the younger version of the title character in an episode of Sheena in 2000. She made a guest appearance on Power Rangers Time Force the following year and received a Young Artist Award nomination for Best Performance in a TV Movie, Miniseries, or Special – Leading Young Actress for her role in The Ghost Club (2003).

Robertson was selected to play Michelle Seaver in the Growing Pains: Return of the Seavers in 2004. A role in Keeping Up with the Steins followed in 2006. She played Cara Burns in the 2007 film Dan in Real Life. Robertson appeared in CSI: Crime Scene Investigation in the episode "Go to Hell", and had a role as a recurring character in the CBS television series Swingtown.

In 2008, she played the protagonist in a Lifetime original film, The Tenth Circle, based on Jodi Picoult's novel of the same name, followed by other television roles.

In 2009, she appeared in Mother and Child. In the same year, she played a small role as DJ in The Alyson Stoner Project. She also made a guest appearance on Law & Order: Special Victims Unit in the episode "Babes" as Tina Bernardi, a Catholic teen who gets pregnant in a pact. In late autumn 2010, she starred as Allie Pennington in the Disney Channel original film Avalon High.

Robertson played the lead role of Lux Cassidy in the television drama series Life Unexpected (2010–2011), which was cancelled in its second season despite positive reviews. In 2011, she appeared in Scream 4. She also had a leading role in the supernatural teen drama television series The Secret Circle (2011–2012), but after its first season, it was also cancelled. That same year, she starred in the film The First Time.

In 2013, she joined the main cast of the science fiction mystery television series Under the Dome in the role of Angie, which she played until 2014. She had subsequent roles in the films Delivery Man (2013) and Ask Me Anything (2014), for which she won the Best Actress award at the Nashville Film Festival. In 2014, Robertson won the Boston Film Festival Award for Best Supporting Actress for White Rabbit. In 2015, she starred in The Longest Ride, and also played the starring role in the film Tomorrowland, for which she was nominated for the Teen Choice Award for Choice Movie Actress – Sci-Fi/Fantasy.

Robertson received wider recognition in 2015 after landing the roles of Sophia Danko in The Longest Ride; she received a nomination for the Teen Choice Award for Choice Movie Actress – Drama. In 2016, she starred in the films Mr. Church and Mother's Day, and in 2017, she starred in the science fiction romance film The Space Between Us and in the comedy-drama film A Dog's Purpose. That same year, she headlined the Netflix comedy television series Girlboss, portraying a fictionalized version of self-made millionaire Sophia Amoruso. She starred in the ABC legal drama For the People for its entire two-season run.

In April 2019, Robertson was cast in the role of Melissa Henning, the real-life wife of Christian rock musician Jeremy Camp, in Lionsgate's faith-based biographical romance film I Still Believe. The film was released in March 2020. In January 2021, Robertson was added to the cast of the ABC drama Big Sky as recurring character Cheyenne Kleinsasser. On July 30, 2021, Robertson was cast in the upcoming independent film The Re-Education of Molly Singer as the title character.

Personal life 
She dated Dylan O'Brien from 2011–2017. On May 25, 2022, Robertson announced her engagement to Paul Floyd.

Filmography

Film

Television

Awards and nominations

References

External links

 

1990 births
Living people
20th-century American actresses
21st-century American actresses
Actresses from Charlotte, North Carolina
Actresses from North Carolina
Actresses from South Carolina
Actors from Greenville, South Carolina
American child actresses
American film actresses
American television actresses